Atavillos Alto District is one of twelve districts of the Huaral Province in Peru.

Geography 
One of the highest mountains of the district is Allqay at  located in the  Puwaq Hanka mountain range. Other mountains are listed below:

References